Boussy-Saint-Antoine is a commune in the Essonne department in Île-de-France in northern France.

The town has close connections with the Dutch village Aagtdorp and the Canadian city of Halifax.

Population
Inhabitants of Boussy-Saint-Antoine are known as Buxaciens in French.

Notable people
Paul Cottin, French archivist

See also
Communes of the Essonne department

References

External links

Official website 

Mayors of Essonne Association 

Communes of Essonne